Ingrid Kressel Vinciguerra (born on 22 November 1973 in Tallinn) is an Estonian diplomat.

She has graduated from University of Tartu with a degree in law.

Member of the Bar since 27 May 1997. Title: Assistant of attorney at law. Bar membership is currently suspended due to the diplomatic service.

Since 1998 she has worked at Ministry of Foreign Affairs.

Since 2019 she is Ambassador of Estonia to Romania, Bulgaria and Moldova.

Ingrid Kressel is awarded with the Commander class of The Order of the Star of Romania.

References

Living people
1973 births
Estonian women diplomats
Ambassadors of Estonia to Romania
Ambassadors of Estonia to Bulgaria
Ambassadors of Estonia to Moldova
University of Tartu alumni